The 2016 Trans-Am Series was the 48th running of the Sports Car Club of America's Trans-Am Series. It is the 50th anniversary of the series' first season

Rule changes
The Ford Mustang and Chevrolet Camaro will receive updated bodywork for TA2 class entries in 2016

TA and TA2 continue essentially unchanged. TA3-I has been renamed TA3 for 2016. TA3-A has been renamed TA4. The new TA5 class has been created for Porsche Carrera Cup cars. Due to increased size of its field, TA2 will have separate race and qualifying sessions than the rest of the series at 11 of the 12 rounds of the championship.

After Round 4 the TA5 class was discontinued and the Porsche Cup cars were rolled back into TA3.

Amy Ruman made history for the third time by becoming the first woman ever to win two consecutive Trans Am Series Championships, in addition to her unprecedented first Trans Am Series win in 2011.

Schedule

The initial schedule was announced November 2, 2015, with an additional event in Detroit announced on March 21, 2016. The Detroit round will be invitational due to space constraints and will not count for championship points.

Calendar and results

Driver standings

TA

TA2

TA3
TA5 class was discontinued and re-combined with TA3 class after five races. The league published a combined standings table tabulated for the first five races as if TA5 and TA3 were contested as a single class and those standings are reflected here. The league also published separate standings tables for the five races where TA3 and TA5 compete separately as well as only for the seven races where they competed as a combined class. Those standings are available here.

TA4

References

Trans-Am Series
TransAm